Albert Fernand-Renault (1887 – 1939) was a French painter. His work was part of the painting event in the art competition at the 1928 Summer Olympics.

References

1887 births
1939 deaths
20th-century French painters
20th-century French male artists
French male painters
Olympic competitors in art competitions
Painters from Paris
19th-century French male artists